Hrisseh is a traditional Lebanese porridge consisting primarily of wheat and meat lamb. It is cooked during two major Lebanese religious celebrations. According to the Shiaa Lebanese community Hrisseh is prepared during the celebration of the end of Ashoura, and during the Assumption day of the Virgin Mary by the Lebanese Christians community.

Christian Community

Bhamdoun 
Hrisseh is the main dish cooked during the Assumption day of the Virgin Mary or also known as "Eid el Saydeh". Usually, the preparations starts early in the morning on the 14th of August of each year, the eve of the Assumption day.

Designated men and women from the village of Bhamdoun, a village which is 23 kilometers away from the capital Beirut with a majority of its inhabitants are Maronite and Orthodox Christians. They gather up outside the yard of Saint Georges church and start preparing the open base fire which will support the 3 cauldrons containing the food mixture. Wood and coal will be used to keep the fire burning all night until all the ingredients dissolve and mixed together. The recipe will require 800 kg of meat lamb, water, and wheat. Usually the celebrations and degustation start late in the evening. The celebration consists of an evening mass at Saint Gorge's church, religious and art exhibitions, parades, fireworks and food corners and at the end the open distribution of the Hrisseh.

History 
Although it is not fully researched, the story says that in the 19th century approximately around the year 1851, a disastrous plague hit the village of Bhamdoun. In the meantime, In Marjeyoun, a close  neighbourhood village, witnessed the appearance of Saint Mary. Saint Mary told the people to transport an ancient religious icon to the main church in Bhamdoun. It has been said that after it was placed inside the main church, the plague disappeared. After a few month the villager decided to take back the icon to its original village. But once they did another epidemic spread in the village so they had to take it back. Since then, each year on the 15Thof August the people cook Hrisseh and celebrate in honor and appreciation to Saint Mary who saved them from the plague.

Recipe 
The recipe consists mainly of

 500g hulled wheat
 1 kg cubed meat shanks
 500g - 1 kg lamb bones (use less if you want lighter results)
 ½ tsp peppercorns
 2 bay leaves
 1 cinnamon stick
 Sea salt

Instructions 
The proper way of preparation vary slightly from region to another. But in general the Hrisseh is composed principally of lamb meat mixed with the lamb's bones, wheat and water. The whole mixture is heated inside big pots until it reaches its ebullition temperature. It is recommended to maintain a firm constant mix of the mixture at high temperatures and it is also required to reduce the temperature before adding the wheat to prevent it from forming clots. The Hrisseh needs to be cooked for more than 5h to ensure a balanced thick dish as an end result. Finally, elasticity indicates that the meat is cooked. The final ingredient is adding salt. Then the hot meal is usually directly served in a warm bowls alongside a traditional Lebanese sweet “el tamrieh".

References 

Lebanese cuisine
Porridges